The MOWAG Pirat is an armored Infantry tank made by the Swiss company MOWAG.

History and development 
Eleven prototypes in different versions were built from 1960 to 1975. Together with the Saurer Tartaruga the MOWAG Pirat was tested by the Swiss Army. Instead, the Army decided to buy the American M113, previously seen as an unsuitable contender. The MOWAG Pirat was the prototype of the later Mowag 3M1 Pirat.

One of these tanks is now in the Full Military museum and one in the tank museum in Thun.

References 

Armoured fighting vehicles of Switzerland
Abandoned military projects of Switzerland